Mirror is an album by jazz saxophonist Charles Lloyd recorded in December 2009 and released on the ECM label.

Reception
The Allmusic review by Thom Jurek awarded the album 4 stars and states "Ultimately, Mirror is another Lloyd triumph. It may not shake the rafters with its kinetics, but it does dazzle with the utterly symbiotic interplay between leader and sidemen".

Track listing
All compositions by Charles Lloyd except as indicated

 "I Fall in Love Too Easily" (Sammy Cahn, Jule Styne) - 5:00
 "Go Down Moses" (Traditional) - 5:59
 "Desolation Sound" - 7:03 
 "La Llorona" (Traditional) - 5:35 
 "Caroline, No" (Tony Asher, Brian Wilson) - 4:02 
 "Monk's Mood" (Thelonious Monk) - 5:01 
 "Mirror" - 6:42 
 "Ruby, My Dear" (Monk) - 5:25 
 "The Water is Wide" (Traditional) - 7:19 
 "Lift Every Voice and Sing" (James Weldon Johnson, John Rosamond Johnson) - 4:29 
 "Being and Becoming" - 7:02 
 "Tagi" - 9:17

Personnel
Charles Lloyd - tenor saxophone, alto saxophone, voice
Jason Moran - piano
Reuben Rogers - bass
Eric Harland - drums, didgeridoo

References

Charles Lloyd (jazz musician) albums
2010 albums
Albums produced by Manfred Eicher
ECM Records albums